The Franklin Interurban Railway, also known as the Nashville Interurban, was an electric interurban rail line that existed in central Tennessee between 1908 and 1942. The train left hourly from 7 a.m. to 11:30 p.m. carrying passengers and freight between the two cities. There were 20 stations listed on line, but passengers could flag down the train at any point to board. Boarded passengers could pull a brake cord to be let off anywhere along the line.  

The rail line was in operation until 1942 when the route was changed over from rail to gasoline powered buses on highways. The interurban buses were discontinued in 1969.

The project began with eight investors in 1902 who met to discuss the idea of an interurban railway. Not much progress was made until Henry H. Mayberry, a Franklin native, moved back to town after making his fortune in the hardware business in Birmingham, Alabama, where he was also vice-president of the Alabama National Bank. When he retired in 1902, he moved back to Franklin and became interested in the interurban railway. He was named president of the interurban project and facilitated financing from the Carnegie Trust Company of New York. When that bank failed, local investors raised the capital themselves. In May, 1907, investors met at the Henry H. Mayberry house to lift a spade of dirt to commemorate the occasion.

Route
From the Franklin main square, the Interurban's route to Nashville went out 3rd Avenue, then north on Bridge Street to cross the Harpeth River; it went around the  Harlinsdale Farm and generally followed Franklin Pike (US 31) to Nashville. Twenty stations were listed for the line, but passengers could wave down the train at any point to be picked up or pull a cord to be let off.  In order to follow the most level path, it crossed Franklin Pike twice before reaching Nashville: the first was near Mallory Station Road, where, as of 2020, the Vanderbilt Legends club stands. (the spot of the marker pictured above). Subsequent stops were Moore's Lane, the Tennessee Baptist Children's Home, Ashlawn, Murray Lane and Kirkman (today's Franklin Road Academy). It crossed Moore's Lane, then crossed back across Franklin Pike near what is now Concord Road. The Hayesland Station still stands. The power station to furnish electricity for the train was near the intersection of Franklin Road and Old Hickory Boulevard. The Nashville terminus was at Bransford Avenue and 8th Avenue South. At this point, passengers could connect with the existing Nashville streetcar line.

References

Interurban railways
Railway lines opened in 1908
Railway lines closed in 1942